Os Caras de Pau (in English, The Barefaceds) is a Brazilian comedy program aired by Rede Globo on Sunday. Created by Chico Soares and directed by Márcio Trigo and starring Leandro Hassum, Marcius Melhem.

Production

Conception 
The program began in a special made by TV Globo in 2006 but came to prominence in 2010 when he won a fixed time in the grid on Sunday. The program began with sketches, such that the best were chosen by the public for the creation of the first DVD of the duo. Result, there was the creation of a program of light and good taste, because it was not something forced, but a program with a script and with people who know what does. In 2010, the recognition came as the humorous Extra TV won the award for the best comedy shows, and the interpreters Leandro Hassum and Marcius Melhem also won awards for best comedians of the year, by Meus Prêmios Nick and the Melhores do Ano. In 2011, the program reached the pinnacle of success, winning the International Prize "Montreux Comedy Awards" in Switzerland.

Cast

Principal

Secondary

Special participation

Ratings
It is estimated that in August 2012, the series was viewed by 7.96 million viewers,[n1] and received an IBOPE rating of 14/40.

References 

 
Rede Globo original programming
Brazilian comedy television series
2006 Brazilian television series debuts
2013 Brazilian television series endings
2000s Brazilian television series
2010s Brazilian television series
Portuguese-language television shows